John Walker (born April 25, 1983) is a former arena football defensive back.

High school years
Walker attended Birmingham High School in Van Nuys, California and was a letterman in football and track.

College career
Walker played college football for the University of Southern California.

Professional career
Walker was signed as a free agent for the National Football League's Houston Texans practice squad in 2006. On February 4, 2008, Walker signed with the Arena Football League's New York Dragons. On October 6, 2010, Walker signed with the Jacksonville Sharks.

Personal life
As a child, Walker was an actor and had roles in 7th Heaven and ER.

See also
 List of Arena Football League and National Football League players

External links
 New York Dragons bio
 Stats at Arena Fan
 Profile at NFL.com

1983 births
Living people
People from Wahiawa, Hawaii
American football cornerbacks
USC Trojans football players
Houston Texans players
New York Dragons players
Jacksonville Sharks players
People from Van Nuys, Los Angeles